The 1950–51 Hong Kong First Division League season was the 40th since its establishment.

League table

References
1950–51 Hong Kong First Division table (RSSSF)

Hong Kong First Division League seasons
Hong
football